Fortesë (Bellacërkë) is a village in Rahovec municipality.

Notes

References 

Villages in Orahovac